Arabhavi Assembly constituency seat is one of the 224 constituencies in the Karnataka Legislative Assembly of Karnataka a south state of India. It is a segment of Belagavi Lok Sabha constituency. It is in Belgaum district.

Members of Legislative Assembly
 1967: A. R. Panchaganvi, Indian National Congress 
 1972: Koujalgi Veeranna Shivalingappa, Indian National Congress
 1978: Koujalgi Veeranna Shivalingappa, Indian National Congress (I) 
 1983: Koujalgi Veeranna Shivalingappa, Indian National Congress 
 1985: R. M. Patil, Janata Party
 1989: Koujalgi Veeranna Shivalingappa, Indian National Congress
 1994: Koujalgi Veeranna Shivalingappa, Indian National Congress
 1999: Koujalgi Veeranna Shivalingappa, Indian National Congress
 2004: Balachandra Laxmanrao Jarkiholi, Janata Dal (Secular)
 2008: Balachandra Laxmanrao Jarkiholi, Janata Dal (Secular)
 2009 (By-Poll): Balachandra Laxmanrao Jarkiholi, Bharatiya Janata Party
 2013: Balachandra Laxmanrao Jarkiholi, Bharatiya Janata Party

Election results

2018

See also
 Arabhavi
 Belagavi district
 List of constituencies of Karnataka Legislative Assembly

References

Assembly constituencies of Karnataka
Belagavi district